Shabandar (also Romanized as Sha‘bāndar and Shaban Dar; also known as Shab Bīdār and Shab Dar) is a village in Sepiddasht Rural District, Papi District, Khorramabad County, Lorestan Province, Iran. At the 2006 census, its population was 249, in 50 families.

References 

Towns and villages in Khorramabad County